Najafabad (also Romanized as Najafābād and Nejafābād) is a village in Titkanlu Rural District, Khabushan District, Faruj County, North Khorasan Province, Iran. At the 2006 census, its population was 732, in 231 families.

References 

Populated places in Faruj County